Whiteford Agricultural Schools (commonly referred to simply as Whiteford) is a public school district in Ottawa Lake, Michigan.  The district includes all of Whiteford Township, as well as a small portion of Riga Township in Lenawee County.  Located just off of U.S. Route 223, the high school and middle school are part of the same building, with the elementary located across the parking lot.

Schools

Elementary schools
Whiteford Elementary School

Secondary schools
Whiteford Middle School
Whiteford High School

Sports

Fall 
 Football
 Volleyball
 Men's and Women's Cross Country

Winter 
 Men's and Women's Basketball

Spring 
 Baseball
 Softball
 Men's and Women's Track
Football and Men's Basketball also have cheerleading programs.

References

External links

Whiteford Agricultural Schools

School districts in Michigan
Education in Monroe County, Michigan
Education in Lenawee County, Michigan
1957 establishments in Michigan
School districts established in 1957